Lawrence Reade can refer to:

 Lawrence Reade (cricketer, born 1846) (1846–1910), New Zealand cricketer
 Lawrence Reade (cricketer, born 1930) (born 1930), New Zealand cricketer